The Leamington Flyers are a junior ice hockey team based in Leamington, Ontario, Canada.  They play in the Western division of the Greater Ontario Junior Hockey League. They are an affiliate of the Ontario Hockey League's Flint Firebirds.

History

Bill Burgess, coach and general manager of the local Intermediate Flyers, formed the Junior Flyers in 1954. They were a Junior B team in the Southwestern League until 1958 when they quit the league.

The Flyers were a part of the BCJBHL 1958 until 1964. When the OHA allowed the Border Cities League to fail in 1964, the town mothballed the junior team and operated a top-notch juvenile team in its stead. In 1966, the team operated as an independent team, playing only in OHA playdowns and exhibition against local all-star, juvenile, and intermediate teams. In 1967, they joined the Western Junior B League.  They entered the new Border Cities league in 1968.  When the league became the Great Lakes Junior C Hockey League in 1970, the Flyers stayed on board.  The Flyers were promoted to the Western Junior "B" league in 1992 and are still a charter member.

On January 3, 1993, the Leamington Flyers helped set a record for the highest scoring tie in the history of the Western Ontario Hockey League by tying the London Nationals 11-11.  The Flyers hold the record for the most lopsided game in the history of the WOHL.  On January 20, 1995, the Flyers defeated the Windsor Bulldogs by a score of 30-3.  On January 26, 2002, the Flyers set the WOHL record for largest margin in a shutout victory by defeating the Aylmer Aces by a score of 16-0.
On Tuesday March 16, 2010, the Leamington Flyers hired Head Coach Tony Piroski.  Previously, as coach of the Essex 73's, Piroski won seven Great Lakes Junior C Hockey League championships and three Clarence Schmalz Cups in nine seasons.

In Piroski's first season the team went from 7 wins to 26 wins, losing Game 7 in overtime to the Lasalle Vipers. In spring 2011 the Flyers brought aboard OHL scout Mike Sadler as the club's general manager.

On May 11, 2015 General Manager Mike Sadler stepped down from the organization. Kevin Hopper takes over as the team General Manager.

April 2, 2018 owner Abe Fehr announced that he had sold the team to 5 local businessman,  Jason Melo, Dan Jancevski, Cam Crowder, David Halliwill & Craig Mahon.  8 year Head Coach Tony Piroski also announced he would not be returning to the team.  in 8 seasons under Piroski the Flyers had a record of 262-108-31 (a .692 winning percentage) in 401 regular-season games with the Flyers and took the team to the conference final four-straight years with two titles.

April 10, 2018 Cam Crowder was named head coach of the Leamington Flyers.  Starting the season with only 10 returning players, Leamington stumbled out of the gate with a 12-8-1-2 record. Following a shocking trade of their top 2 scorers Maddux Rychel and Griffin Robinson, Leamington went on to finish the regular season 21-4-1-1 and claim the Western Conference regular season title. Leamington played Strathroy in the first round and clinched the series 4-1. Moving on to the conference semifinals Leamington played a tightly contested playoff series coming back from a 1-3 deficit defeating the Komoka Kings on home ice to clinch the series 4-3. In the Western Conference finals the young Flyers team were out matched by a veteran London Nationals team , and were swept 0-4.

Although the season ended in disappointment , Leamington had a very successful season having multiple award winners. Adam Jeffrey Top Rookie Scorer, Ryan Gagnier Rookie of the year, Levi Tetrault Defenceman of year, Zach Borgiel Goalie of year, and Cam Crowder being named coach of the year. 

The current version of the Leamington Flyers lead by Cam Crowder and General Manager Justin Solcz, take great pride in competing for the Sutherland cup while developing players for higher levels of hockey. The 2018-19 team moved on 2 players to major junior ( Ryan Gagnier Oshawa Generals and Colton O'Brien Quebec Remparts), and   4 players to tier II

 The Leamington Flyers and the Ontario Hockey League's Flint Firebirds announced an affiliation agreement in June 2019 prior to the 2019-2020 season.

Season-by-season results

2022-23 coaching staff

General Manager: Justin Solcz
Ass't General Manager: Matt Dumouchelle
Head coach: Dale Mitchell
Assistant coach: Mark Ridout
Assistant coach: Kade McKibbin
Goalie Coach: Matt Anthony
Video coach: Garrett Fodor
Trainer: Donald Mouck

Clarence Schmalz Cup appearances
1972: Leamington Flyers defeated Cobourg Cougars 4-games-to-1
1980: Leamington Flyers defeated Bradford Blues 4-games-to-none

Notable alumni
Chris Allen
Darren Banks
T.J. Brodie
Tim Gleason
Zack Kassian
Kris Manery
Steve Ott
Eric Reitz
Charlie Stephens
Tim Hrynewich
Ryan Gagnier
Colton O'Brien
Tyler Wall

References

External links
Flyers Webpage

Western Junior B Hockey League teams
Leamington, Ontario